Microsoft Classroom was an online blended learning platform for schools that aimed to simplify grading assignments and student communication in a paperless way. It was introduced for Office 365 Education subscribers in April 2016.

On May 18, 2017 Microsoft announced the retirement of Microsoft Classroom, which was completed on January 31, 2018. Some features of Microsoft Classroom became part of Microsoft Teams in Office 365 Education.

References

External links 
 

Educational software
2016 software
Discontinued Microsoft software
Microsoft Office
Classroom management software